The 2000–01 Anycall Professional Basketball season was the fifth season of the Korean Basketball League.

Regular season

Playoffs

Prize money
Suwon Samsung Thunders: KRW 150,000,000 (champions + regular-season 1st place)
Changwon LG Sakers: KRW 80,000,000 (runners-up + regular-season 2nd place)
Cheongju SK Knights: KRW 20,000,000 (regular-season 3rd place)

External links
Official KBL website (Korean & English)

1999–2000
2000–01 in South Korean basketball
2000–01 in Asian basketball leagues